The 1500th anniversary of Kyiv, the capital of Ukraine, was commemorated in 1982.  Although archaeologists have found evidence that Kyiv was founded in either the 6th or 7th century, and the settlement may have been mentioned in documents more than two millennia ago, the observance of the 1500th anniversary in 1982 is based on a now traditional founding date of 482 for the city.

To celebrate the anniversary, many important monuments were restored, and new monuments, such as the Monument to the Founders of Kyiv and the Arch of Freedom of the Ukrainian people, were constructed.  The people of Kyiv enjoyed the festivities so much that Kyiv Day was established as an official holiday in 1987, commemorated on the last Sunday of May.

Gallery

See also 
 History of Kyiv
 Kyi, Shchek and Khoryv

References 

1500th anniversary of Kyiv
1982 in the Soviet Union
Anniversaries of cities
Events in Kyiv

uk:Святкування 1500-річчя Києва